The Agrio Formation is an  Early Cretaceous geologic formation that is up to  thick and is located in the southern Mendoza Province and northern-central Neuquén Province, in the Neuquén Basin of northwestern Patagonia, Argentina. This formation is the youngest one of the Mendoza Group, overlying the Mulichinco and Bajada Colorada Formations and overlain by the Huitrín and La Amarga Formations. It is dated to the Late Valanginian to Early Hauterivian, Late Valanginian to Early Barremian, or Hauterivian to earliest Aptian.

The Agrio Formation is considered the third most important source rock in the hydrocarbon-rich Neuquén Basin, after the Vaca Muerta Formation and Los Molles Formation. Similarly to these older units, it is potentially a source of shale gas.

This formation has provided fossils of ichthyosaurs, ammonites, gastropods, bivalves, decapods, echinoderm, corals and fish. The newly described species of fish, Tranawuen agrioensis, the ammonite Holcoptychites agrioensis, and the bivalve Pholadomya agrioensis have been named after the formation.

Description 

The Agrio Formation was first described by Weaver in 1931 and its three members, from bottom to top: Pilmatué, Avilé and Agua de la Mula Members, were defined by Leanza and Hugo in 2001. The southern termination of the formation is the Huincul High, formed by the Huincul Fault. Towards the east in the basin, the formation grades into the Centenario Formation.

Stratigraphy 

The Agrio Formation is included in the Mendoza Group, representing its youngest formation. In the east of the Neuquén Basin, the formation rests upon continental clastic deposits of the Mulichinco Formation, with the contact between the two formations characterized by a regional transgressive surface. Towards the west, the formation unconformably overlies the Bajada Colorada Formation. In its eastern part, the Agrio Formation is overlain by the clastic, carbonaceous and evaporitic deposits of the Huitrín Formation and in the western area by the La Amarga Formation.

Lithologies 

The Agrio Formation is primarily composed of pelitic rocks with intercalations of limestones, sandstones and rare fine conglomerates. The Pilmatué and Agua de la Mula Members are characterized by thick successions of black shales with intercalating limestones and sandstones. The Avilé Member comprises sandstones and claystones with conglomerates.

Depositional environment 
The Agrio Formation was deposited in a post-rift setting of the Neuquén Basin, probably representing a tectonic regime of thermal subsidence. The sediments of the lower and upper members of the formation are marine in character, interpreted as the combination of thermal subsidence and a eustatic sea level rise. The middle Avilé member was deposited in a fluvial environment. The presence of the newly described gastropod Eunerinea mendozana led researchers to estimate tropical conditions for the Agrio Formation.

Fossil content 
The formation has provided many fossils of ammonites, gastropods, bivalves, corals, decapods, echinoids, crinoids and nano and microfossils (calcareous nanofossils, ostracods, foraminifers).

In 2018, ichthyosaur remains not determined to the genus level were described from the Agrio Formation, suggesting the possibility of viviparity of these marine reptiles in the epeiric sea of the Neuquén Basin. The finds were notable as well because of a relative lack of abundance of ichthyosaur fossils from the Valanginian to Hauterivian worldwide. Fossil fish of Gyrodus huiliches, and Tranawuen agrioensis were described from the formation in 2019.

The decapod Palaeohomarus pacificus, and ammonites Curacoites rotundus and Sabaudiella riverorum were described from the formation in 2012, the gastropods Ampullina pichinka and Mesalia? kushea in 2016, and the ammonite Comahueites aequalicostatus in 2018.

Newly described species of fish, Tranawuen agrioensis, ammonite, Holcoptychites agrioensis, and the bivalve Pholadomya agrioensis were named after the formation.

The first known brittle stars in the Southern Hemisphere and Cretaceous age have been identified in Agrio Formation. However, fossils are not complete enough to define species.

Petroleum geology 
The Agrio Formation is considered the third-most important source rock of the hydrocarbon-rich Neuquén Basin, after the older Vaca Muerta and Los Molles Formations. Two levels of organic-rich sediments exist in the formation, related to the marine transgressions of the late Valanginian and the late Hauterivian, in the Pilmatué and Agua de la Mula Members respectively. The organic properties of the formation are similar to the Vaca Muerta, with a TOC value averaging 2.5%, with some levels up to 5%. The kerogen types are II to II/III.

Gallery

See also 
 List of dinosaur-bearing rock formations
 Caiuá Formation, contemporaneous fossiliferous formation of the Paraná Basin
 Cerro Barcino Formation, contemporaneous fossiliferous formation of the Cañadón Asfalto Basin
 Zapata and Río Belgrano Formations, contemporaneous fossiliferous formations of the Magallanes or Austral Basin

References

Bibliography 

General
 
 
 
 
 
 
 
 
 
 
 
 

Paleontology
 
 
 
 
 
 
 
 
 
 

Geologic map
 

Geologic formations of Argentina
Lower Cretaceous Series of South America
Cretaceous Argentina
Aptian Stage
Barremian Stage
Hauterivian Stage
Valanginian Stage
Shale formations
Conglomerate formations
Sandstone formations
Limestone formations
Deep marine deposits
Shallow marine deposits
Deltaic deposits
Fluvial deposits
Reef deposits
Source rock formations
Shale gas
Formations
Geology of Mendoza Province
Geology of Neuquén Province
Geology of Patagonia